Ballentine/Broad Creek is a Tide Light Rail station in Norfolk, Virginia. It opened in August 2011, and is  situated just west of Ballentine Boulevard. The station is adjacent to the east end of Norfolk State University and several residential neighborhoods.

References

External links 
Ballentine / Broad Creek station

Tide Light Rail stations
Railway stations in the United States opened in 2011
2011 establishments in Virginia